The Carnival Band may refer to:

 The Carnival Band (Canadian band), a marching band and community orchestra based in East Vancouver, Canada
 The Carnival Band (folk group), an English early music group